Kushoniyon District (before 2018: Bokhtar District) is a district in Khatlon Region, Tajikistan, surrounding the regional capital Qurghonteppa (Bokhtar). Its administrative capital is the town of Ismoili Somoni (pop. 8,500). The population of Kushoniyon District is 245,900 (January 2020 estimate).

Administrative divisions
They are as follows:

History
On 7 January 1944 the district was created under the named Oktyabr District (ноҳияи Октябр) was created in the Qurghonteppa Oblast. On 6 January 1965 the District was renamed to Kommunisti District (ноҳияи Коммунистӣ). Then in 1990 the district was renamed to Bokhtar District. And finally in 2018 - to Kushoniyon District.

Geology
Bokhtar area forms part of Amu Darya basin. This basin has been estimated to contain vast reserves of oil, natural gas and condensate.

References

Districts of Khatlon Region
Districts of Tajikistan